Austin Airways was a passenger airline and freight carrier based in Timmins, Ontario, and one of the oldest in Canada.

Code Information

ICAO Code:
IATA Code: AAW
Call Sign:

History
Established as Capreol and Austin Air Services was one of Canada's oldest airline and started service in 1934. The home base was Timmins and it operated many duties in addition to passenger and freight services. Over the years, scheduled services served over 40 cities, including one destination in the United States. In 1973 it merged with White River Air Services but continued to operate as Austin Airways.

In June 1987 it merged with Air Ontario Ltd (formerly Great Lakes Airlines (Canada), formed in 1958) to form Air Ontario Inc. In turn Air Ontario became part of Air Canada Jazz in 2001.

The April 26, 1987 Air Ontario/Austin Airways joint system timetable listed Air Canada Connector code share flights operated by both airlines on behalf of Air Canada with Austin Airways operating 14-passenger Beechcraft 99, 7-passenger Cessna 402, 19-passenger de Havilland Canada DHC-6 Twin Otter, 37-passenger de Havilland Canada DHC-8 Dash 8 and 40 to 43-passenger Hawker Siddeley HS 748 aircraft at this time.  The HS 748 turboprop was the largest aircraft operated by Austin Airways.

Historical Fleet
Over its long history, Austin Airways operated the following aircraft:

Beech 99 (turboprop)
Cessna Citation (business jet)
Cessna 402
Consolidated PBY Canso (amphibian aircraft)
de Havilland Canada DHC-2 Beaver
de Havilland Canada DHC-3 Otter
de Havilland Canada DHC-6 Twin Otter (STOL capable turboprop)
Douglas DC-3 (includes C-47 model)
Hawker Siddeley HS 748 (turboprop)

Destinations
The following destinations were served by Austin Airways during its existence.  Most of the destinations served by the airline were isolated and remote airports in northern Ontario and Quebec provinces as well as in the Northwest Territories (NWT) (now Nunavut) in Canada in addition to several larger airports across Ontario. Minneapolis/St. Paul in the U.S. was the only non-Canadian destination served by the airline during its existence.

Ontario Province

 Attawapiskat, Ontario
 Bear Lake, Ontario
 Bearskin Lake, Ontario
 Big Trout Lake, Ontario
 Cochrane, Ontario
 Fort Albany, Ontario
 Fort Hope, Ontario
 Fort Severn, Ontario - most northerly destination
 Geraldton, Ontario
 Kapuskasing, Ontario
 Kasabonika Lake, Ontario
 Kashechewan First Nation, Ontario
 Kenora, Ontario
 Lansdowne House, Ontario
 Manitouwadge, Ontario
 Marathon, Ontario
 Moosonee, Ontario
 Nakina, Ontario
 Pickle Lake, Ontario
 Pikangikum, Ontario
 Red Lake, Ontario
 Round Lake, Ontario
 Sachigo Lake, Ontario
 Sandy Lake, Ontario
 Sioux Lookout, Ontario
 Sudbury, Ontario
 Thunder Bay, Ontario 
 Timmins, Ontario - location of company headquarters
 Toronto, Ontario 
 Trenton, Ontario
 Webequie First Nation, Ontario
 Winisk, Ontario
 Windsor, Ontario - most southerly destination

Quebec Province

Akulivik, Quebec
Eastmain, Quebec
Fort George (now Chisasibi, Quebec)
Fort Rupert, Quebec
Great Whale (now Kuujjuarapik, Quebec)
Inukjuak, Quebec
Ivujivik, Quebec
Povungnituk, Quebec
Rupert House (now Waskaganish, Quebec)
Sugluk (now Salluit, Quebec)

Nunavut 
Formerly part of the Northwest Territories

Cape Dorset
Sanikiluaq

U.S.
 Minneapolis/St. Paul, Minnesota - only U.S. destination

Accidents and incidents
On 9 January 1964  Douglas C-47 CF-ILQ crashed 50 minutes after take-off on a cargo flight from Moosonee to Nemiscan Settlement, Ontario. Both pilots were seriously injured, but were pulled from the aircraft 4–5 days later by a search and rescue party and ultimately survived. It was determined that the crash was caused by fuel deprivation leading to engine failure of both of the aircraft's engines. To this day, the hulk of the aircraft still sits where it had crashed in 1964, despite being partially salvaged, and burned from a forest fire that swept across the area in the mid-1980s.
On 9 November 1969, Douglas C-47B CF-AAL crashed on approach to Timmins, Ontario killing two of the four people on board. The aircraft was operating a domestic flight from Winisk, Ontario.
On 19 June 1970, Douglas C-47A CF-AAC was written off in an accident at Val-d'Or, Quebec.
On 4 September 1976, DHC-3 CF-MIT struck power lines in the Abitibi Canyon near Fraserdale, Ontario in below VFR conditions, with loss of all 10 people on board, the worst accident in the airline's history.
On 10 December 1976, Douglas C-47A C-FIAX crashed on take-off from Chisasibi, Quebec. All eight people on board survived.
After clipping the top of the tower the pilot lost use of ailerons and plane began flipping over. He used the rudder to correct and spotted the runway making a controlled crash landing. The pilot saved all 5 on board with his actions but he himself suffered two crushed vertebrae.

See also 
 List of defunct airlines of Canada

References

External links

 Community Voices
 Ontario Plaques - Austin Airways
 Canada's Aviation Hall of Fame - Austin
 Canada's Aviation Hall of Fame - Russell
 Partial Fleet Listing
 Austin Airways yahoo group

Defunct airlines of Canada
Air Canada
Airlines established in 1934
Airlines disestablished in 1987
Economy of Timmins
1934 establishments in Ontario
1987 disestablishments in Ontario
1987 mergers and acquisitions
Defunct seaplane operators
Canadian companies established in 1934
Canadian companies disestablished in 1987